Ingré is a commune in the Loiret department, central France. It is part of the urban area of Orléans.

Population

Twin towns — sister cities
Ingré is twinned with:

  Castel Maggiore, Italy (2011)
  Drensteinfurt, Germany (2017)

See also
 Communes of the Loiret department

References

External links
 Ingré municipal website 
 Annuaire-Mairie.fr: Ingré  

Communes of Loiret
Loiret communes articles needing translation from French Wikipedia